Buccochromis is a genus of relatively large haplochromine cichlids endemic to Lake Malawi and the upper Shire River in East Africa.

Species
There are currently seven recognized species in this genus:
 Buccochromis atritaeniatus (Regan, 1922)
 Buccochromis heterotaenia (Trewavas, 1935)
 Buccochromis lepturus (Regan, 1922) (Slendertail Hap)
 Buccochromis nototaenia (Boulenger, 1902) (Stripeback Hap)
 Buccochromis oculatus (Trewavas, 1935)
 Buccochromis rhoadesii (Boulenger, 1908)
 Buccochromis spectabilis (Trewavas, 1935)

References

 
 
Cichlid genera
Taxa named by Ethelwynn Trewavas